Naarda postpallida is a species of moth in the family Noctuidae first described by Joseph de Joannis in 1929.

References

Herminiinae
Moths described in 1929